Salle Werner Vaughn (born 1939) is an American artist. 
Vaughn was born in Tyler, Texas.

Largely known for her paintings, Houston-based Vaughn has also converted a set of early 20th century cottages along the 4600 block of Blossom Street, Houston, into an art installation called "Harmonium". She began working ont he houses in the early 1980s.

Her work is included in the collections of the Metropolitan Museum of Art, and the Museum of Fine Arts, Houston

References

Living people
1939 births
20th-century American artists
21st-century American artists
20th-century American women artists
21st-century American women artists